Darko Juričić (born 28 August 1969) is a retired Croatian athlete who specialised in the 400 metres hurdles. He represented his country at the 2000 Summer Olympics failing to progress to the semifinals. His biggest success was the silver medal at the 2001 Mediterranean Games.

Competition record

Personal bests
Outdoor
200 metres – 20.85 (Biella 1998)
400 metres – 46.37 (Split 1999)
400 metres hurdles – 49.88 (Budapest 1998) NR
Indoor
400 metres – 46.78 (Piraeus 1999)

References

1969 births
Living people
Croatian male sprinters
Croatian male hurdlers
Athletes (track and field) at the 2000 Summer Olympics
Olympic athletes of Croatia
Mediterranean Games silver medalists for Croatia
Mediterranean Games medalists in athletics
Athletes (track and field) at the 2001 Mediterranean Games